Burnett is a town in Dodge County, Wisconsin, United States. The population was 919 at the 2000 census. The census-designated place of Burnett is located in the town, and the unincorporated community of Rolling Prairie is located partially in the town.

History
The town was named for Ellsworth Burnett(e), a government surveyor who was killed by Indians in November 1835.

Geography

Demographics
As of the census of 2000, there were 919 people, 330 households, and 265 families residing in the town. The racial makeup of the town was 98.59% White, 0.33% African American, 0.65% from other races, and 0.44% from two or more races. Hispanic or Latino of any race were 0.87% of the population.

There were 330 households, out of which 34.2% had children under the age of 18 living with them, 70.9% were married couples living together, 4.5% had a female householder with no husband present, and 19.4% were non-families. 17.0% of all households were made up of individuals, and 8.5% had someone living alone who was 65 years of age or older. The average household size was 2.78 and the average family size was 3.14.

In the town, the population was spread out, with 26.7% under the age of 18, 6.9% from 18 to 24, 28.8% from 25 to 44, 26.1% from 45 to 64, and 11.5% who were 65 years of age or older. The median age was 38 years. For every 100 females, there were 107.9 males. For every 100 females age 18 and over, there were 106.1 males.

The median income for a household in the town was $55,000, and the median income for a family was $59,750. Males had a median income of $35,263 versus $24,875 for females. The per capita income for the town was $22,043. About 4.2% of families and 5.8% of the population were below the poverty line, including 7.5% of those under age 18 and 7.0% of those age 65 or over.

Notable people

 Russ Bogda (1911–1958), businessman and president of the Green Bay Packers Corporation
 Lillian Heath (1865–1962), the first female doctor in Wyoming
 George F. Merrill (1847–1941), Wisconsin state senator
 Fred E. Moul (1878–1955), Wisconsin state representative
 Daniel D. Murphy (1866-1944), farmer, businessman, and Minnesota state senators
 Elmer C. Nitschke (1911–1982), Wisconsin state senator
 Don Peachey (born 1933), Hall of Fame musician and band leader
 Leander H. Shepard (1825–1893), Wisconsin state representative

References

Towns in Dodge County, Wisconsin
Towns in Wisconsin